Matthew Robinson (born 27 July 1944) is a British-Cambodian television and film executive producer, producer, director and writer. After graduating from Cambridge University. he directed many hundreds of episodes of popular British television dramas and soap operas in the 1970s and 1980s. He became the first producer (and later became the executive producer) of the series Byker Grove (1989–1997), and was also made the executive producer of EastEnders (1998–2000).

He finished his British television career as the Head of Drama for BBC Wales. Since 2003 he has been based in Cambodia, where he runs his own production company, Khmer Mekong Films.

Early life
Robinson was educated at Huntingdon Grammar School (1955–58), Friends School in Saffron Walden (1958–63) and King's College, Cambridge (1963–66), where he studied economics, edited Cambridge University student newspaper Varsity and graduated with a master's degree.

Career

Early work

Robinson's first job in television was as a researcher on the weekly consumer affairs programme On the Braden Beat made by ATV in 1966. He started directing in BBC Current Affairs (1969–73) on The Money Programme, 24 Hours and Nationwide. This was followed by many hundreds of episodes of popular TV drama including Softly, Softly: Taskforce, Play for Today, Z-Cars, Emmerdale, Crown Court, Coronation Street, Angels, Brookside, Howard's Way and Bergerac. Robinson had a "reputation as an action director", and was employed to direct two Doctor Who adventures, Resurrection of the Daleks (1984) and Attack of the Cybermen (1985). He was also responsible for casting Terry Molloy as Davros, who went on to play the role twice more on television and in further audio dramas. Under pseudonym Henry Seaton he wrote 30 episodes of Central TV's Crossroads in 1986. Writing work also included two plays about television – Did Anyone Else Think TK9 Was Brilliant? and SUDS – staged in two London fringe theatres in 1981 and 1983. In fringe theatre he first met Leslie Grantham, an actor he subsequently cast in a guest role in Doctor Who and recommended for the role of Den Watts in EastEnders.

Byker Grove

From 1989 to 1997 Robinson set up, produced and part-directed the BBC's Newcastle-based teenage drama serial Byker Grove. He cast Anthony McPartlin and Declan Donnelly as young heroes P.J. and Duncan and in 1993 launched their post-Byker Grove careers. Now known as Ant & Dec they are the UK's foremost light entertainment act. Robinson told them to "Stay together through any row you have, whatever it is, be together and you could be the future Morecambe and Wise. I think they have proved that in many ways." According to the BBC, Byker Grove tackled "many controversial issues" including a gay storyline between characters Noddy and Gary which even led The Sun to call for Robinson to be sacked at the time. Robinson left Byker Grove in 1998 to become the executive producer of EastEnders but the series continued until 2006.

EastEnders

Having previously worked for producer Julia Smith on Angels, Robinson was employed to be lead director of BBC1's soap opera EastEnders when it launched in 1985. His early casting included actors for the iconic characters "Dirty" Den Watts (Leslie Grantham), Pauline Fowler (Wendy Richard), Dot Cotton (June Brown), Nick Cotton (John Altman), Ian Beale (Adam Woodyatt), Charlie Cotton (Christopher Hancock) and Tony Carpenter (Oscar James).

In 1998 Robinson was appointed executive producer of EastEnders by Mal Young (BBC Head of Drama Series) and Peter Salmon (Controller of BBC1), and nicknamed the "Pope of Soap" by The Sun. During his reign EastEnders won the BAFTA for "Best Soap" in consecutive years (1999 and 2000) and many other awards.

Robinson soon earned the additional tabloid soubriquet "Axeman of Albert Square". He wrote out a large number of characters in one hit, including Sanjay Kapoor (Deepak Verma), Gita Kapoor (Shobu Kapoor), Neelam Kapoor (Jamila Massey), Michael Rose (Russell Floyd), Susan Rose (Tilly Vosburgh), Bruno and Luisa di Marco (Leon Lissek and Stella Tanner), Ruth Fowler (Caroline Paterson), George Palmer (Paul Moriarty) and original character Dr Legg (Leonard Fenton). He later went on to axe others including Tony Hills (Mark Homer), Simon Raymond (Andrew Lynford) and Huw Edwards (Richard Elis), and oversaw the high-profile exits of Tiffany Mitchell (Martine McCutcheon), Grant Mitchell (Ross Kemp) and Bianca Butcher (Patsy Palmer).

In their place Robinson introduced new long-running characters including Melanie Healy (Tamzin Outhwaite), Jamie Mitchell (Jack Ryder), Lisa Shaw (Lucy Benjamin), Steve Owen (Martin Kemp), Billy Mitchell (Perry Fenwick) and reintroduced Janine Butcher as a villain played by Charlie Brooks.

Later career
Robinson left EastEnders in 2000 to serve as Head of Drama for BBC Wales. He was executive producer on a BBC Wales production Care that won the Best Single Drama BAFTA Award in 2001.

In May 2003, Robinson left the UK for Cambodia to devise and produce a HIV health-related TV drama. The 100 episodes of Taste of Life – broadcast on the main entertainment channel, TV5, repeated on the state channel TVK – were financed by the British Government through the Department for International Development and managed by the BBC World Service Trust. In 2006 after Taste of Life ended its run (at one point gaining an audience of just over 50% of the country's population – then 14 million), he set up a film and television production company, Khmer Mekong Films (KMF) in Cambodia's capital Phnom Penh.

In addition to KMF's numerous TV dramas, documentaries and TV spots, he has produced ten Khmer language feature films, seven released on the Cambodian cinema circuit – Staying Single When 2007, Palace of Dreams 2008 (for BBC World Service Trust), Vanished 2009 and Price of Love  2016 (directed & written by Robinson based on an original story by BBC Script Producer Stuart Cheetham). Price of Love won four top awards at the 5th Cambodian National Film Festival (2017) including Best Film and Best Actress. King Selfie (directed and written by Robinson based on a story by English novelist Matthew Baylis), released in Cambodia in March 2018. A thriller, Fear, was released in July 2019 to critical acclaim but mediocre box office.

The 7th film Move Out (in the popular 'Khmer Ghost Movie' genre) was released across Cambodia on 5 December 2019 achieving excellent box office returns. All stages of an 8th feature film, 360 Degrees, a romantic comedy, were completed in January 2020.

Shooting on a 9th film Day in the Country was completed in December 2019, a four-year project about an arranged marriage written and directed by Robinson. Exhibition of the 8th and 9th films await the return of full audiences to Cambodian cinemas once fears of COVID-19 have diminished. 
 
A 10th feature film, Dance Till You Drop, a Bollywood-style movie set in Phnom Penh, started shooting in February 2020 but had to be abandoned in March because of dangers to the performers and crew from COVID. In late October 2020, filming resumed and, after a fortnight, the movie was completed on 2 November. Its release, as with '360 Degrees' and 'Day in the Country', await the all-clear from the local cinema circuit. 

Since 2015, Robinson has written a blog on EastEnders fansite Walford Web, sharing anecdotes about his two stints working on the show (1984–87 & 1998–99).

Personal life

Robinson is the older brother of singer-songwriter, bassist, radio presenter and long-time LGBT rights activist Tom Robinson.

In 2020 Robinson received Cambodian citizenship from Prime Minister Samdech Hun Sen following support from the Minister of Culture and Fine Arts.

References

External links 
 The Sun's "Pope of Soap" article 18 July 1998
Khmer Mekong Films
Matthew Robinson's Walford Web blog
Taste of Life

1944 births
Alumni of King's College, Cambridge
BBC executives
BBC television producers
British expatriates in Cambodia
British film producers
British television directors
Businesspeople from London
Living people
People educated at Friends School Saffron Walden
Soap opera producers
Writers from London